Currently the Antarctic Heritage Trust consists of two partners, the Antarctic Heritage Trust (New Zealand) which was formed in 1987 and the UK Antarctic Heritage Trust, founded in 1993.  The Trust is a coalition established to promote the following stated goals:

Promote awareness of the human history of Antarctica and its relevance to the modern world: and to that end 
Identify, restore, preserve and record historic sites in Antarctica, the structures on them and the artifacts, which they contain 
Restore, preserve and protect, where appropriate, other elements, including archival records, of the historical heritage of human endeavour in Antarctica 
Provide means by which interested people and organisations may contribute to the achievement of the coalitions objectives 
Be guided by appropriate heritage management standards 
Conform to the principles, purposes and spirit of the Antarctic Treaty, in particular, annex V, Area Protection and Management, of the protocol on Environmental Protection of Antarctica (The Madrid Protocol); and to  
Cooperate with coalition partners, and others with Antarctic interests, to achieve these objectives.

See also
Antarctic Heritage Trust (New Zealand)
UK Antarctic Heritage Trust

External links
Official website

Science and technology in Antarctica
New Zealand and the Antarctic
United Kingdom and the Antarctic